A Study on Kamrupi: A Dialect of Assamese is a book on Kamrupi dialect of the Assamese language, written by Upendranath Goswami. It gives detail account of origin and development of Kamrupi language, spanning a period of early first millennium CE to modern times. It discusses the growth of Kamrupi literature, from its apabhramsa stage in form of copper plates, seals, Charyapada to literature developed in mid twentieth century.

See also
 The Moth Eaten Howdah of the Tusker

References

1970 non-fiction books
Indian non-fiction books
Books from Assam
Kamrupi culture
20th-century Indian books